Jarmo Kekäläinen (born July 3, 1966) is a Finnish professional ice hockey executive and former player who briefly played in the National Hockey League (NHL) with the Boston Bruins and Ottawa Senators. Kekäläinen serves as the general manager of the Columbus Blue Jackets.

Playing career
Kekäläinen began his hockey career in his native Finland, playing for four years in Finland with a number of teams as well as for Finland in the 1986 World Junior Ice Hockey Championship. Kekäläinen then played for the Clarkson Golden Knights for three years, establishing himself and gaining interest from professional teams. In his second year with the Knights, he scored 44 points in 31 games and was named to the ECAC Hockey League first all star team. In his third year with the Knights, he scored 18 points in eight games before signing with the Boston Bruins. Kekäläinen played parts of two seasons with the Bruins before returning to Finland, where he played for another two years. For the 1993-1994 season, Kekäläinen went back to North America, where he signed with the Ottawa Senators. He played briefly with the Senators that season, playing in 28 games. The following season, Kekäläinen played in Sweden before retiring in 1995 because of knee problems which were caused by injuries.

Executive career
Immediately after retirement Kekäläinen became involved with front office work in many capacities. He was general manager of IFK Helsinki in the Finnish Elite League from 1995 to 1999, during which time IFK won one Kanada-malja and finished as the runner-up to TPS the following year. During this time with IFK, Kekäläinen also worked in several capacities with the Ottawa Senators. After he left Finland in 1999 Kekäläinen became director of player personnel for the Senators until 2002. While with the Senators he helped in selecting future NHL stars Marian Hossa, Martin Havlat, and Ray Emery. In 2002 Kekäläinen joined the St. Louis Blues as assistant general manager and director of amateur scouting, where he helped draft much of the core of the team in the early 2010s, including defenseman Alex Pietrangelo and forwards T. J. Oshie, Patrik Berglund, David Perron, and David Backes. After being passed over for the Blues' general manager job for Doug Armstrong, Kekäläinen returned to Finland to take the general manager job with Jokerit.

While with Jokerit, Kekäläinen had an unwritten escape clause with ownership that permitted him to leave if he was offered a general manager job in the NHL. That opportunity came on February 13, 2013, when after Scott Howson was fired the previous day, the Columbus Blue Jackets' president of hockey operations John Davidson, under whom Kekäläinen had worked while with the Blues, hired Kekäläinen to be the new general manager of the Blue Jackets. As a result, Kekäläinen became the first European general manager in the National Hockey League.

On April 28, 2021 Kekäläinen was named assistant general manager of Finland's national team for the 2022 Olympic Games.

Personal life
Kekäläinen has a bachelor's degree in management from Clarkson, and graduated with a M.Sc. (Econ.) in marketing from the University of Tampere in 2000. He was selected as the alumnus of the year in 2018. Kekäläinen has a wife and two daughters.

Career statistics

Regular season and playoffs

International

Awards and honors

References

External links
 
 St. Louis Blues profile

1966 births
Living people
Boston Bruins players
Clarkson Golden Knights men's ice hockey players
Columbus Blue Jackets executives
Finnish expatriate ice hockey players in Canada
Finnish expatriate ice hockey players in Sweden
Finnish expatriate ice hockey players in Switzerland
Finnish expatriate ice hockey players in the United States
Finnish ice hockey administrators
Finnish ice hockey left wingers
Ilves players
KalPa players
Maine Mariners players
National Hockey League general managers
Ottawa Senators executives
Ottawa Senators players
Prince Edward Island Senators players
Ice hockey people from Tampere
St. Louis Blues executives
St. Louis Blues scouts
Tappara players
Undrafted National Hockey League players
VIK Västerås HK players